Mary Gideon (born 10 December 1989) is a Nigerian Badminton player.

Career 
Mary Gideon won the 2009 African Women's Doubles Championship with Grace Daniel. Both were also successful together at the Mauritius International of the same year and took part in the 2009 Badminton World Championship.

Sporting achievements

References 

1989 births
Nigerian female badminton players
Living people